Domingo Julio Liberato Macario Gómez García (20 December 1886 in Madrid – 22 December 1973) was a Spanish composer.

Works, editions and recordings
Recordings:
 Julio Gómez - Canciones. Anna Tonna (mezzo-soprano) Jorge Robaina (piano). Verso
 Julio Gómez - Obra sinfónica completa. Orquesta de Córdoba. José Luis Temes. Verso
 Julio Gómez - Lirico concerto for piano and orchestra. Orquesta Nacional de España. Joaquin Parra (piano) Jose Collado (conductor)

References

1886 births
1973 deaths
Spanish composers
Spanish male composers
20th-century Spanish male musicians